The list of Professor Shonku adventures include 38 stories of Professor Shonku adventures written by Satyajit Ray. The first "Shonku" story Byomjatrir Diary (An Astronaut's Diary) was published in the Sandesh in 1965. It was a long story describing Professor Shonku's space travel. The last Shonku adventure Intelectron remained unfinished after Ray's death.

1—10

11—20

See also 
 Bengali science fiction
 Feluda

References 
 Citations

 Sources
 

Professor Shonku
Indian science fiction
Bengali-language literature